The Military Knights of Windsor, originally the Alms Knights and informally the Poor Knights, are retired military officers who receive a pension and accommodation at Windsor Castle, and who provide support for the Order of the Garter and for the services of St. George's Chapel, Windsor Castle. They are commanded by a senior retired officer as Governor of the Military Knights of Windsor.

History 
The Alms Knights of St. George's Chapel were constituted by King Edward III following the Battle of Crécy (1346), when many knights captured by the French were forced to liquidate their estates to raise ransom money in order to secure their release.  At the original establishment of the Order of the Garter and its chapel at Windsor (1348), veteran warriors were called to "serve God continually in prayer". In the statutes of the College of St. George's, a community of twenty-six bedesmen, called Alms Knights or Poor Knights, were appointed. Their duties included attending four services per day and praying for the sovereign and the knights of the Order of the Garter and rooms.

The Alms Knights were a chantry, a religious foundation organized to pray for its patron. Poor Knights were originally impoverished military veterans. They were required to pray daily for the Sovereign and Knights Companions of the Order of the Garter; in return, they received 12d per day and 40s per year, and were lodged in Windsor Castle. Poverty was an important attribute of bedesmen, and indeed if any Poor Knight were to acquire assets with annual income of £20 or more, he would be removed from the college.

King Henry VIII halved their number to thirteen, Elizabeth I re-founded the order in 1559. At his restoration, King Charles II increased the number to eighteen. King William IV renamed them the Military Knights of Windsor in 1833.

Today, the Military Knights, who are no longer necessarily poor, but are still military pensioners, participate in the Order's processions, escorting the Knights and Ladies of the Garter, and attend the daily services in St. George's Chapel. They are not members of the Order itself, nor are they automatically a knight of any chivalric order.

Governor
The office of Governor of the Military Knights of Windsor is part of the Royal Household of the Sovereign of the United Kingdom, and dates from the mid-sixteenth century. From 1905 it has been controlled by the Constable of Windsor Castle, having formerly been responsible to the Dean of Windsor. Since 1906 the Governor has always been a senior retired officer.

List of governors of the Military Knights of Windsor

c.1583: John Moulsworth (Mowlesworth) of Helpston, co Northants: will dated 7 August 1583, Proved PCC 18 July 1584. Buried at St John the Baptist, New Windsor 2 September 1583
to 1771: Sir William Wittewronge
c.1820: Colonel Thomas Bassett
1842: Captain John Jonstone Cumming 
1843: Major Charles Moore
1843-1844: Captain Thomas Fernyhough, who died after 6mths in office. He was the first person to be buried in the catacombs beneath St George's Chapel. (Ref: 9/1/1844 and 16/1/1844 in the London Standard, The Colburn’s United Service Magazine 1844 ) 
1867: Major Sir John Paul Hopkins
1892: His Grace The Duke of Argyll, KT GCMG GCVO PC 1892–1906
1906: Major-General Edward Henry Courtney
1913: Major-General Walter Carteret Carey
1932: Lieutenant-General Sir Charles Kavanagh, KCB KCMG CVO DSO
1951: Major-General Sir Edmund Hakewill-Smith, KCVO CB CBE MC
1978: Major-General Sir Peter Gillett, KCVO CB CBE
1989: Major-General Sir Peter Downward, KCVO CB DSO DFC
2000: Major-General Sir Michael Hobbs, KCVO CBE
2012: Lieutenant-General Peter Pearson CB CBE

External links

History from St. George's Chapel
The Military Knights of Windsor, 1352-1944. Historical monographs relating to St. George's Chapel, Windsor Castle Volume 4. Edmund Fellowes (1944)

References

 
Windsor Castle
Ceremonial officers in the United Kingdom